Elmer Strange Tutwiler (November 19, 1904 – May 3, 1976) was a Major League Baseball pitcher who played in two games with the Pittsburgh Pirates in .

External links

1904 births
1976 deaths
Major League Baseball pitchers
Baseball players from Alabama
People from Carbon Hill, Alabama
Pittsburgh Pirates players
Laurel Lumberjacks players